Croatian Bol Ladies Open was an annual women's tennis tournament on the WTA Challenger Tour, played in the town of Bol on the Croatian Adriatic island of Brač. The tournament's first edition was held in late April 1991, and then again every year from 1995 to 2003. The tournament was then sold to the organizers of the Western & Southern Open and moved to Cincinnati. In 2022, tournament was moved to Makarska.

Past finals

Singles

Doubles

Other
There is a ITF women's tennis tournament called Bluesun Bol Ladies Open or Bluesun Ladies Open that is held at the same courts.

See also
 Makarska International Championships
 Croatia Open
 Zagreb Indoors
 Zagreb Open

References

External links
 Tournament finals 2006-1971

 
WTA Tour
Bol, Croatia
Tennis tournaments in Croatia
Clay court tennis tournaments
Brač
Recurring sporting events established in 1991
Recurring sporting events disestablished in 2003
1991 establishments in Croatia
2003 disestablishments in Croatia
Recurring sporting events established in 2016
2016 establishments in Croatia